Dicoria (twinbugs) is a genus of North American flowering plants in the tribe Heliantheae within the family Asteraceae, native to the southwestern United States and northwestern Mexico.

 Species
 Dicoria argentea Strother - northwestern Mexico (Sonora)
 Dicoria calliptera Rose & Standl. - northwestern Mexico (Sonora)
 Dicoria canescens A.Gray - northwestern Mexico (Baja California, Sonora), United States (California Nevada Arizona Utah New Mexico Colorado)

References

External links
 Jepson Manual eFlora (TJM2) treatment of Dicoria
 USDA Plants Profile for Dicoria

Heliantheae
Asteraceae genera
Flora of Northwestern Mexico
Flora of the Southwestern United States